From the Hip is an album by Frank Marino released in 1990, under Par Excellence Music. The album shows Marino's usual style of guitar-driven hard rock, including elements of funk and blues, and an 11-minute jazz fusion/arena rock instrumental: "Rise Above".

The album was reissued in CD in 1993 by the German label SPV and in 2005 by Just a Minute! Records under the moniker Frank Marino & Mahogany Rush.

Track listing

Remastered 2005 CD issue bonus track

Personnel
Frank Marino - Guitar, Vocals, Arranger, Producer
Vince Marino - Rhythm Guitar
Peter Dowse - Bass, Cover Art
Timm Biery - Drums

Additional personnel
Alan Jordan - Vocals (Background)
Rob Howell - Rhythm Guitar on track 6
Rob Heaney - Engineer

References

1990 albums
Frank Marino albums